Cecil Augusta (born 1920) was an American Delta blues singer and guitarist. He recorded a single track, "Stop All the Buses", for Alan Lomax in Memphis, Tennessee, in 1959, which was ignored until it was released on the album Blues Songbook, a selection of Lomax's field recordings, in 2003. The musicologist David Evans described Augusta as "the perfect example of an artist who shows up at a field recording session and leaves before anyone realizes how good he was" and noted his unique acoustic guitar technique, elements of which later became integral to electric blues playing.

References

External links
 Cecil Augusta, "Stop All The Blues" (1959), Association for Cultural Equity

1920 births
Possibly living people
Delta blues musicians
African-American guitarists
African-American male singer-songwriters
Country blues singers
Blues musicians from Mississippi
American blues guitarists
American male guitarists
American blues singer-songwriters
Singer-songwriters from Mississippi
Guitarists from Mississippi
20th-century American guitarists
20th-century African-American male singers